Läskisoosi (officially sianlihakastike, English: Pork sauce) is traditional Finnish stew, made of pork belly fried in butter with onions and flour, stirred in water with salt and pepper. It is often served with mashed potato, pickled cucumber and lingonberry.

See also
 List of stews

References 

Finnish stews
National dishes